Nikola Spasov (15 December 1958 – 23 November 2020) was a Bulgarian professional footballer and coach.

Playing career
Born in Sofia, Spasov played for PFC Lokomotiv Sofia, FC Dunav Ruse, PFC Cherno More Varna and PFC Spartak Varna in his country. With the first club, he won the Bulgarian League in his first professional season.

Spasov moved to Portugal in December 1986, and remained in the nation for the following seven years, representing five teams. In the 1989–90 campaign he scored a career-best 34 goals for F.C. Paços de Ferreira, which however failed to promote them from the second division; in the top flight he played with S.C. Farense, S.C. Beira-Mar and Paços.

In June 1994, after one season in his homeland with former team Cherno More, Spasov retired from football at nearly 36 years of age.

Coaching career
Spasov started managing in Portugal and Spain, in both countries at amateur level. In 2003, he was appointed at PFC Marek Dupnitsa in his country, switching to the Republic of Macedonia and FK Bregalnica Štip the following season.

From 2006 and during four years, Spasov worked with former club Cherno More, as assistant, head coach and scout. In 2011, he returned to Bregalnica.

On 3 January 2018, he was announced as the new manager of the Kazakhstan Premier League team Kyzylzhar. Spasov has managed Tsarsko Selo on two occasions – during 2016/2017 as well as between June 2018 and April 2020.

Honours

Player

Lokomotiv Sofia
Bulgarian League: 1977–78

Manager
Cherno More
Bulgarian Cup: 2014–15
Bulgarian Supercup: 2015

Tsarsko Selo
Bulgarian Second League: 2018–19

Personal life
Spasov's younger brother, Yulian (born 1963), was also a footballer. A midfielder, he too represented Spartak and Cherno More Varna, and also spent several years as a professional in Portugal (nine seasons, including eight with Paços de Ferreira).

On 23 November 2020, Spasov died from COVID-19 in Montana, amid the COVID-19 pandemic in Bulgaria.

References

External links

1958 births
2020 deaths
Footballers from Sofia
Bulgarian footballers
Bulgarian expatriate sportspeople in Spain
Association football forwards
First Professional Football League (Bulgaria) players
FC Lokomotiv 1929 Sofia players
PFC Cherno More Varna players
PFC Spartak Varna players
Primeira Liga players
Liga Portugal 2 players
S.C. Farense players
S.C. Salgueiros players
F.C. Paços de Ferreira players
S.C. Beira-Mar players
Rio Ave F.C. players
Bulgarian expatriate footballers
Expatriate footballers in Portugal
Bulgarian expatriate sportspeople in Portugal
Bulgarian football managers
FK Bregalnica Štip managers
PFC Cherno More Varna managers
PFC Svetkavitsa managers
Expatriate football managers in Spain
Expatriate football managers in Portugal
Bulgarian expatriate football managers
Expatriate football managers in North Macedonia
FC Dunav Ruse players
FC Kyzylzhar managers
Expatriate football managers in Kazakhstan
Bulgarian expatriate sportspeople in Kazakhstan
Bulgarian expatriate sportspeople in North Macedonia
Deaths from the COVID-19 pandemic in Bulgaria
S.C. Freamunde players